Frederick Marlow (9 November 1928 – March 2013) was an English professional footballer who played as a half-back or as an inside forward in the Football League for Grimsby Town and York City, in non-League football for Hillsborough Boys' Club, Buxton, Goole Town, Boston United and Scarborough and was on the books of Arsenal and Sheffield Wednesday without making a league appearance.

References

1928 births
2013 deaths
Footballers from Sheffield
English footballers
Association football midfielders
Association football forwards
Arsenal F.C. players
Sheffield Wednesday F.C. players
Buxton F.C. players
Grimsby Town F.C. players
Goole Town F.C. players
Boston United F.C. players
York City F.C. players
Scarborough F.C. players
English Football League players